Paula Medina (born 12 April 1989, in Tuluá) is a Colombian table tennis player. She represented Colombia at the 2012 Summer Olympics.

Career
Medina win the gold medal in women's team competition at the 2010 Central American and Caribbean Games in Mayaguez, Puerto Rico. She also won the bronze in the women's doubles.

Medina fell in the semi-final round of the 2011 Latin American Cup held in Rio de Janeiro, Brazil, after being defeated by Dominican Republic's Wu Xue.

References

Colombian table tennis players
Table tennis players at the 2008 Summer Olympics
Table tennis players at the 2012 Summer Olympics
Olympic table tennis players of Colombia
Pan American Games medalists in table tennis
1989 births
Living people
Pan American Games bronze medalists for Colombia
Central American and Caribbean Games gold medalists for Colombia
Central American and Caribbean Games silver medalists for Colombia
Competitors at the 2010 Central American and Caribbean Games
Competitors at the 2014 Central American and Caribbean Games
Sportspeople from Valle del Cauca Department
South American Games gold medalists for Colombia
South American Games silver medalists for Colombia
South American Games bronze medalists for Colombia
South American Games medalists in table tennis
Table tennis players at the 2011 Pan American Games
Competitors at the 2006 South American Games
Central American and Caribbean Games medalists in table tennis
Medalists at the 2011 Pan American Games
Table tennis players at the 2015 Pan American Games
21st-century Colombian women